Nicholas Alexander Chavez (born September 6, 1999) Is an American actor. He currently plays Spencer Cassadine on the ABC Soap Opera, General Hospital. In 2022, Chavez won the Daytime Emmy Award for Outstanding Younger Performer in a Drama Series for his work as Spencer.

Early life and education
Chavez was born in Houston, Texas. He has three younger half-siblings. He lived in Sugar Land, Texas before his family relocated to Denver, CO. By age five, his parents had broken up and settled in Colorado where he split his time between his mother's home in Denver and his father's hometown of Arvada. As a kid, Chavez spent a lot of time outdoors, snowboarding, hiking and mountain biking. He described himself as a "precocious kid." At an early age, Chavez developed a bug for performing, including recreating the blessing of the Eucharist which he saw at Mass on Sundays. He was also a member of the Colorado Children's Chorale and performed at the Ellie Caulkins Opera House and the Denver Center for the Performing Arts.

Chavez attended East High School where he played football, following in the footsteps of his athletic family. Chavez joined his school's speech and debate team headed by his mentor, Matt Murphy. When Murphy took over the drama department a year later, he recruited Chavez, then a junior, to play Atticus Finch in the school's production of To Kill a Mockingbird. Chavez quit football to focus on the play. As it left a lasting impression on his father, Chavez decided to move forward with acting. As a senior, Chavez began studying at Visionbox Studio Theater under Jennifer McCray Rincón. While he couldn't afford to pay her, Chavez assisted around the theatre while Rincón helped him prepare for college auditions. Chavez applied to the top 10 drama programs in the United States, including Rutgers University, Carnegie Mellon University, New York University and the Juilliard School. With the exception of Juilliard, Chavez was accepted to all of the schools. Chavez attended the Mason Gross School of the Arts at Rutgers. After two years, Chavez took a leave of absence from Rutgers and relocated to Los Angeles to pursue acting full time. However, he was forced to go back to Vero Beach, Florida with his father when the COVID-19 pandemic struck in 2020. Chavez worked a few odd jobs, including at a car dealership, while he submitted self-tape auditions.

Career
On July 1, 2021, Chavez made his television debut as Spencer on General Hospital. Chavez signed a three year contract. Only a few months into his General Hospital tenure, Chavez mourned the loss of his longtime manager, Jenevieve Brewer. In 2022, Chavez starred as Jason in the Tubi original film, Crushed.

Filmography

Awards and nominations

References

External links
 

1999 births
Living people
Male actors from Denver
Male actors from Houston
American male television actors
American male soap opera actors
Daytime Emmy Award winners
Daytime Emmy Award for Outstanding Younger Performer in a Drama Series winners
21st-century American male actors
Hispanic and Latino American male actors